St Martin's Church is an Anglican parish church in Dorking, Surrey. It is a Grade II* listed building and surviving parts of the structure date back to the Middle Ages. It in the archdeaconry of Dorking, in the Diocese of Guildford. The church is the main Anglican parish church in Dorking and was refurbished to the designs of Henry Woodyer.

History

Early history
In the Domesday Book of 1086 there is a mention of a church in the Manor of Dorking. The present church was originally built in the twelfth century probably to replace the previous one. In the 14th century the church was extended and conveyed to the Priory of the Holy Cross in Reigate. It also served as a school house for parts of the 17th century.

19th century
In the 19th century, sizeable renovations were done to the church. Between 1835 and 1837 the nave was rebuilt. From 1866 to 1868, this was followed by the chancel being rebuilt. In 1872, the nave and aisles were restored again, this time under the direction of the architect Henry Woodyer.

From 1873 to 1877, a new tower and a spire (210 feet high) were added. The bells, which were acquired in 1626 were then rehung in the new bell tower. In 1912, work on extending the lady chapel was completed.

Parish

Church
The church is also shared with the local Methodist congregation. In 1973, the Methodist church in Dorking closed and an agreement was drawn up whereby they could share the church building. In 1976, another agreement was reached so that the nearby Christian Centre could be used by both congregations as a church hall.

School
The church has a close relationship with the nearby St Martin's Church of England Primary School. According to the school's Vision and Values it states that, 'We are a Church School and we will build on strong family values that encourage tolerance and respect for the whole of our richly diverse community.'

Gallery

See also

 Dorking
 List of places of worship in Mole Valley
 St Joseph's Church, Dorking

References

External links
 St Martin's Parish website

Dorking
Dorking
Dorking
Churches completed in 1877
Gothic Revival church buildings in England
1877 establishments in England
Gothic Revival architecture in Surrey
Diocese of Guildford